Macdonald High School (also known as Mac) is an English-language public high school in  Sainte-Anne-de-Bellevue, Quebec, Canada. It has about 1,000 students and is administered by the Lester B. Pearson School Board.

History
The school's building was completed in 1906 as the Brotestant Day School of Ste. Anne de Bellevue. It was a model observation and practice school for the newly built Macdonald Campus School for Teachers. All four teachers and all but four of the 99 initial students were boarders, living at the school.

References

External links
Official website of Macdonald High School

High schools in Montreal
English-language schools in Quebec
Lester B. Pearson School Board
Educational institutions established in 1907
1907 establishments in Quebec
Sainte-Anne-de-Bellevue, Quebec